Chicagooceras is a genus of orthocerids from the Silurian of North America.

Shells are short, breviconic, and faintly curved. Sutures are fairly wide spaced and though straight, slope slightly, dorso-ventrally, to the rear. Siphuncle: small,  slightly ventral of the center, thought to be orthochoanitic (straight septal necks) and cylindrical (tubular connecting rings).

References

 Walter c. Sweet, 1964. Nautiloidea -Orthocerida. Treatise on Invertebrate Paleontology, Part K. Geological Society of America.
 Chicagooceras in Fossilworks.

Prehistoric nautiloid genera
Silurian animals